Dialpur (ਦਿਆਲਪੁਰ) or Dayalpur  (ਦਿਆਲਪੁਰ) is a village in Jalandhar district as well as Kapurthala district of Punjab State, India. The village is unique as it is one of the few villages that falls under two districts of Punjab. The village is administrated by a Sarpanch who is an elected representative of village as per the constitution of India and Panchayati raj (India).

Demography 
According to the report published by Census India in 2011, Dialpur has a total number of 918 houses and population of 3,995 of which include 2,240 males and 1,755 females. Literacy rate of Dialpur is 80.29%, higher than state average of 75.84%.  The population of children under the age of 6 years is 398 which is  9.96% of total population of Dialpur, and child sex ratio is approximately  785, lower than state average of 846.

Caste  
The village has schedule caste (SC) constitutes 28.89% of total population of the village and it doesn't have any Schedule Tribe (ST) population,

Population data

Air travel connectivity 
The closest airport to the village is Sri Guru Ram Dass Jee International Airport.

Villages in Kapurthala

External links
  Villages in Kapurthala
 Kapurthala Villages List

References

Villages in Kapurthala district